"True Heart" is a song written by Michael Clark and Don Schlitz, and recorded by American country music group The Oak Ridge Boys.  It was released in February 1988 as the second single from the album Heartbeat.  The song reached #5 on the Billboard Hot Country Singles & Tracks chart.

The Oak Ridge Boys have re-recorded the song twice since its original release. They recorded a new vocal arrangement (using the original music track) for the single release, which also appeared on their Greatest Hits Volume Three compilation in 1989. The new vocal arrangement fades the song, removing the extended instrumental ending. In 2011, the group recorded an entirely new arrangement of the song produced by Michael Sykes and Duane Allen on their It's Only Natural project for Cracker Barrel Old Country Store. While the original recording (and the 1989 vocal re-cut) had Steve Sanders on baritone, the newest version was recorded with William Lee Golden on baritone vocals.

Charts

Weekly charts

Year-end charts

References

1988 singles
1987 songs
The Oak Ridge Boys songs
Songs written by Michael Clark (songwriter)
Songs written by Don Schlitz
Song recordings produced by Jimmy Bowen
MCA Records singles